23 Ramadan is the twenty-third day of the ninth month (Ramadan) of the Islamic calendar.

In the conventional Lunar Hijri calendar, this day is the 259th day of the year.

Births

 220 AH – Ahmad ibn Tulun, the founder of the Tulunid dynasty that ruled Egypt and Syria between 868 and 905 AD

Deaths
 247 AH – Ahmad ibn Isa ibn Zayd, the grandson of Zayd ibn Ali, one of the famous Alawites of the early Abbasid caliphate and one of the famous Zaidiyyah scholars
 539 AH – Fatemeh Baghdadieh, an Iraqis Hadith scholar woman who lived mostly in Isfahan
 1384 AH – Javad Fumani Haeri, an Iranian Ayatollah, revolutionary fighter and Shia scholar

Events
 491 AH – Occupation of Jerusalem by the Crusaders
 1254 AH – End of writing the valuable jurisprudential book "Jawahir al-Kalam" by Muhammad Hasan al-Najafi
 1261 AH – End of writing the perfect book on Islamic philosophy "Manẓuma" by Hadi Sabzavari
 1392 AH – End of writing the notable tafsir (exegesis of the Quran) "Tafsir al-Mizan" by Muhammad Husayn Tabatabai
 The day of the revelation of the Quran, holy book of Islam (more probable, according to the narrations)

Holidays and observances
 The third Qadr Night of Ramadan according to Shiites and most important of them, holding an official nightlife worship ceremony called Ehya night in Iran

See also
 19 Ramadan
 21 Ramadan
 13 Rajab

References

Islamic calendar